"Til Death" is a song by American singer-songwriter Wynter Gordon. It is the second single to be released from her debut album, With the Music I Die (2011) and her With the Music I Die EP (2011) exclusively released in the US. The song was remixed by Denzal Park and was released as the official single internationally.

Music video
Two versions of the music video were released, featuring the original version of the track and the Denzal Park remix. The video features Wynter and friends in a dead-style fashion which they become alive when the music is played and party, which after they die again.

Track listing
US digital download
 "Til Death" – 3:05

Til Death (Remixes)
 "Til Death" (Dan Castro Remix) – 7:26
 "Til Death" (R3hab Remix) – 5:22
 "Til Death" (PolenRockers Remix) – 4:37
 "Til Death" (PolenRockers Remix Radio Edit) – 3:11
 "Til Death" (Ken Loi Remix) – 6:32
 "Til Death" (Denzal Park Radio Edit) – 2:59
 "Til Death" (WaWa Remix) – 5:11

International digital download
 "Til Death" (Denzal Park Radio Edit) – 2:59

Australian remixes
 "Til Death" (Dan Castro Remix) – 7:26
 "Til Death" (Denzal Park Extended Mix) – 5:01
 "Til Death" (PolenRockers Remix) – 4:37
 "Til Death" (WaWa Remix) – 5:11
 "Til Death" (Oxford Hustlers Club Mix) – 6:28
 "Til Death" (Andy Murphy & DJ Jorj Mix) – 6:05

Charts

Weekly charts

Year-end charts

Certifications

Release history

References

2011 singles
2011 songs
House music songs
Songs written by Vitamin C (singer)
Songs written by Wynter Gordon
Wynter Gordon songs